Hybrid Ice is the debut album from the Pennsylvania-based rock band Hybrid Ice, released in 1982. Although not released on a major label, the album reached No. 5 on regional album charts in the US. It contains the hit song "Magdelene," which received much radio play and was later covered in 1994 by Boston on their album Walk On.

In 1984, Boston had asked to record Magdelene for what would later become their Third Stage album, Hybrid Ice agreed to stop sales of their own album. But the song didn't make it to a Boston album until 1994. Six years later, in 2000, Hybrid Ice signed a deal with Escape Records of England, and re-released the album (with Magdelene) on compact disc.

Track listing

All songs: lyrics and music by Rusty Foulke, copyright 1982,  except "Castle Walls", (lyrics and music by Robert Scott Richardson), copyright 1982, "Looking Glass" (lyrics and music by Robert Scott Richardson, copyright 1998) and "Test of Time" (lyrics and music by Rusty Foulke, copyright 1998).

Original release
"On We Go" – 3:44
"Think it Over" – 3:50
"Magdelene" – 3:39
"Wounded" – 3:01
"Rock and Roll Forever" – 4:28
"Castle Walls" – 5:33
"Heart of the Night" – 3:52
"Please Tell Maryann" – 3:16
"Do You Believe in Rock N Roll" – 3:51

2000 Re-release
"Looking Glass" – 4:49
"On We Go" – 3:44
"Think it Over" – 3:50
"Magdelene" – 3:39
"Wounded" – 3:01
"Rock and Roll Forever" – 4:28
"Castle Walls" – 5:33
"Heart of the Night" – 3:52
"Please Tell Maryann" – 3:16
"Do You Believe in Rock N Roll" – 3:51
"Test of Time" – 4:06

Personnel
 Robert Scott Richardson – vocals, keyboards, bass, drums
 Chris Alburger – vocals, guitar
 Rick Klinger – vocals, drums
 Jeff Willoughby – vocals, bass
 Bernie Garzio – vocals, bass
 Rusty Foulke – vocals, lead guitar

Production
 Producer: John Palumbo
 Engineer: Victor Giordano
 Mixers: Bob Spangler, Rusty Foulke
 Studio assistants: Dexter Kunkle, Keith Hummel, Mickey Tarone, Paul Vanderbeck

References

External links
Biography
 Interview with Strutter Magazine

1982 debut albums